Nova Ukraine is a US-based nonprofit organization dedicated to raising awareness about Ukraine in the United States and around the world and strengthening civil society in Ukraine by providing humanitarian aid. Nova Ukraine prides itself as an "all-volunteer organization" with no costs being spent on executive leadership salaries. Since its creation in 2014 after the events of Euromaidan, the nonprofit launched numerous charitable programs aimed at helping Ukraine and its people. Since February 2022, Nova Ukraine rapidly increased humanitarian aid operations as a response to the Russian invasion of Ukraine. Nova Ukraine raised over $30M in humanitarian aid for Ukrainians in 2022 within the first months of the Russian invasion.

Background and formation 
The organization was founded in March, 2014 in the aftermath of Euromaidan as an extension of the Maydan SF movement. Nova Ukraine, which translates into "New Ukraine", is officially registered as a public charity, and as such, does not conduct or promote any political activities or campaigns.

Originally from Kharkiv, Ukraine, Nick was also one of the founding members of Maydan SF. Nova Ukraine has a large volunteer base of people with diverse professional backgrounds and nationalities.

The nonprofit helps the most vulnerable segments of the population in Ukraine, refugees and families of those who suffered from the military actions in the Eastern Ukraine and also promotes Ukrainian culture in the U.S. Located in Palo Alto, CA, the heart of Silicon Valley, Nova Ukraine aims to use the region's intellectual and financial might to support Ukraine. The ultimate goal is to improve lives of the Ukrainians in need through healthcare, education and other essential aid, assist Ukraine in recovering from the recent economic and social crisis, and foster country's prosperity along the way.

Nova Ukraine focuses on organizing fundraising, media and cultural events to bring public attention to the Ukrainian issues. It also initiates meetings and concerts with well-known Ukrainians as well as roundtable discussions dedicated to Ukraine and its culture.

In 2014, Nova Ukraine collected and donated nearly $100,000 towards humanitarian aid to Ukraine.

In 2022, Nova Ukraine rapidly raised, deployed and scaled operations related to the Russian invasion of Ukraine. Nova Ukraine has raised over $20M in humanitarian aid to assist refugees, those on the ground in Ukraine with medical aid, food, and other essential supplies.

Activities 
Since July 2014 Nova Ukraine supports Station Kharkiv, a voluntary initiative that provides aid to IDPs and hundreds of affected families from the anti-terrorist operation in ATO zone.

In August 2014 Nova Ukraine co-organized the performance of Skryabin in San Francisco. The famous Ukrainian band donated part of the concert's revenue to charitable projects carried out by Nova Ukraine.

Another fundraiser held in September 2014 involved participation of Ruslana, Eurovision contest winner and Euromaidan revolution activist. The charity auction brought together more than two hundred people, mostly Tech Gem 2014 conference attendees. The raised money were transferred to Ruslana's Ukrainian Sunrise Charitable Foundation and directed to helping internally displaced people in Ukraine.

In February 2014 Okean Elzy gave their jubilee concert called "OE - 20 Years Together". Organized by the joint initiative of two California-based nonprofit organizations, Nova Ukraine and "Save Lives Together", Okean Elzy concert donated all the profits from the ticket sales to buy medications for hospitals and to equip ambulances operating in the area of the military conflict in Ukraine. The necessary medical equipment worth $23,000 was bought and directly distributed in the most needed regions of Ukraine.

In November 2015 Nova Ukraine sponsored and organized a presentation in Berkeley by Ukrainian musician and civic activist Sviatoslav Vakarchuk - "How Can Ukraine Become a Prosperous Country in Europe?".

In early 2022, Nova Ukraine has been conducting efforts provide emergency aid Ukrainian refugees as a result of the Russian invasion of Ukraine. In 2022, Nova Ukraine has delivered over 1 million meals, 100,000 deliveries of supplies, recruited over 3,500 volunteers and assisted over 1.25 million Ukrainian refugees.

Nova Ukraine works closely with other nonprofits and volunteers focused on helping Ukraine.

Ranking 
In 2014 Nova Ukraine was ranked the second most popular Ukrainian nonprofit organization in the U.S. by Ukrainian Chicago magazine.

In 2022, Forbes ranked Nova Ukraine as #5 on its list of fundraising leaders in efforts to support Ukrainians.

References

External links 
 Nova Ukraine Website

Organizations established in 2014
Ukrainian-American culture
Charities based in California
Foreign charities operating in Ukraine
2014 establishments in California

See also 
Razom
U24
Come Back Alive